Virtuosos is a Hungarian classical music-based reality competition television program for children and young adults, contested by players of classical instruments and classical singers drawn from nationwide auditions. The show is broadcast on Hungarian's MTVA network, airing a total of 5 seasons . Mariann Peller producer is responsible for developing the format of the show. The show's patron is the wife of the President of Hungary, Mrs. Anita Hercegh.

Summary
Throughout the competition, the contestants perform not only classical pieces, but movie theme songs and crossover music as well. Their performances are judged by 5 professional judges – in the fourth season the judges were András Batta, Gergely Kesselyák, Erika Miklósa, János Balázs, István Várdai. The goal is to discover talented people and provide them with strong professional background, attention, challenges and performance opportunities necessary for growth, and has resulted in auditions by thousands of musicians, and boosting applications to music schools.

Broadcast
The first season of the show began in October 2014 and ended in December 2014. The second season aired from 15 April to 8 June 2016. The third season aired from 7 April to 2 June 2017. A fourth season debuted in April 2018 and the 5th one, a spin-off called "Chamber Virtuosos" was broadcast from 3 May 2019 to 7 June 2019.

Background
In May 2018 it was announced that Placido Domingo has become a shareholder in Virtuosos Holding Ltd., which owns the international rights to the program.

New shareholders in October 2018:  Contessa Maria Bardossy de Weisz Hungarian-born Venezuelan philanthropist is taking the talent show to South America. Peter Draper, former marketing director of Umbro, Manchester United and Valencia CF joins Virtuosos Holding Ltd. as Vice President International Development. Imre Szabó Stein media specialist also becomes a shareholder.

Seasons 1-4
 – Grand Prize winner

Season 5 
In 2019, for the fifth season, the show has changed completely, this year it was called the Chamber Virtuosi. Eight ensembles entered the competition, one of which was voted out in each broadcast, leaving three for the final. The participants in this season (finalists in bold):

 Aeris Brass Quintet
 Custos Consort
 Flautica
 Harmóniautasok
 Pontasto Guitar Quartet
 Sárközy Lajos and his ensemble
 Seven Sax
 TanBorEn Trio

The final was won by the TanBorEn Trio, as voted by the audience.

Season 6 - Virtuosos V4+ 
In 2020, competitors from five countries - Hungary, Poland, Serbia, the Czech Republic and Slovakia - competed. During the qualifying rounds, four to four competitors from each country qualified for the semi-finals, with two from each country advancing to the semi-finals.

This time, the jury was composed of one member from each country, starting with the semi-finals: Erika Miklósa (Hungary), Alicja Węgorzewska (Poland), Nemanja Radulović, later Silvana Grujić (Serbia), Gabriela Boháčová (Czech Republic) and Peter Valentovič (Slovakia). The sixth member, the "super jury", was a famous artist for each programme: composer Gabriel Prokofiev in the first semi-final, violinist Maksim Vengerov in the second and opera singer and conductor Plácido Domingo in the final. The two presenters were Ida Nowakowska and Thomas Gottschalk.

Season 6 winners:

Hungary - Ildiko Rozsonits (piano)

Poland - Dawid Siwiecki (accordion)

Serbia - Vuk Vukaljović (guitar)

Czech Republic - Martin Sulc (accordion)

Slovakia - Ajna Marosz (recorder)

Season 7 - Virtuosos V4+ 
In 2021, Virtuosos V4+ will be joined by Croatia, alongside the Visegrad Four countries (Hungary, Slovakia, Czech Republic, Poland). The international jury will include famous Croatian cellist HAUSER and the one-man "super jury" this year will be world-renowned opera singer-conductor Maestro Plácido Domingo himself. The selection broadcasts started on the 19th of November 2021 on Duna Television.

The Young Virtuosos Foundation
The creators of the show support young musicians even after the end of the series. For this, the "Young Virtuosos Foundation" was set up to help these young artists with professional and financial support, scholarships and by organizing concerts at the most prestigious venues in the world, from the United States through Europe to Asia.

Some of the young musicians discovered by Virtuosos perform every year on the New Year’s Eve concert at the Hungarian Academy of Music or at Müpa (Palace of Arts Budapest), which is occasionally broadcast on national TV. Other memorable performances include the Hungarian week in Shanghai, the grand opening event of Hungary's Visegrad Four Presidency, at the Strasbourg Human Right Convention at the Palace of Europe,  the opening ceremony of Formula 1 Hungarian Grand Prix, for the delegates of the Budapest NATO summit, at the Kossuth Award gala, at the Olympics’ honouring ceremony near the Hungarian Parliament, and also at Asia Music Festival in Shenzhen for an audience of 40.000.

The Virtuosos Ensemble
Virtuosos discovered dozens of brilliant talents in every season. The main goal is to keep these young talents in the music industry, give them further opportunity of professional development and performing. So the Young Virtuosos Foundation created and supports a small chamber orchestra formed by some of the greatest talents discovered in Virtuosos.  
The Virtuosos Ensemble essentially expresses what the Virtuosos movement is about: the love of music and each other, the gesture of that improving the whole community by playing music together and, of course, the flourishing talent that makes the Virtuosos Ensemble concerts so stunning. Not only the performance of the team led by Szüts Apor is impressive, but also their creativity. A new musical brand is being born here: this unique chamber ensemble type had not previously exist in classical music, because here everyone is a soloist and also a team player. 
The proceeds of their concerts often benefit the Young Virtuosos Foundation.

References

Sources
 Október 17-én indul a Virtuózok MTVA.hu

External links
 Official website
 Facebook page
 YouTube-channel

2014 Hungarian television series debuts
2018 Hungarian television series endings
Hungarian reality television series
Magyar Televízió original programming
Classical music television series